IIHL may refer to:

International Independent Hockey League
Irish Ice Hockey League
International Institute of Humanitarian Law